Rolling Thunder aka John Pope, 1916–1996) was a hippie spiritual leader who self-identified as a Native American medicine man. He was raised in Oklahoma and later moved to Nevada. He has been considered an example of a plastic medicine man.

Controversy
Rolling Thunder worked for most of his life as a brakeman under the name John Pope. Going by his chosen name, Rolling Thunder, he appears in taped interviews with John Trudell and Michael Chosa in which he discusses the contemporary treatment of Native Americans. At times he claimed to be part Hopi, at times Cherokee, and at other times Shoshone and that he could represent the Western Shoshone Nation. He never provided proof of any Native heritage, nor have any Native people claimed him. He has been cited as an example of a plastic medicine man. Rolling Thunder is mentioned in a number of books on the New Age, 1960s counterculture, cultural appropriation, cultural imperialism, and neoshamanism.

Death
Rolling Thunder died in 1997 from complications associated with diabetes. He also suffered from emphysema in the later years of his life.

Legacy
It operated until 1985; visitors over the years included Mickey Hart.

Bibliography
 Native Healer: Initiation Into an Ancient Art by Bobby Lake-Thom and Robert G. Lake – 1991 (Foreword by Rolling Thunder) Quest Books 
 Rolling Thunder by Doug Boyd - 1982 (Foreword by Dee Brown) Bantam Doubleday Dell

Discography
 Rolling Thunder – Mickey Hart (1972)
  Rolling Thunder Speaks: the Owyhee Confrontation (Audio Book)
  From Alcatraz to Chicago - with John Trudell and Michael Chosa (Audio Book)

Filmography
 Rolling Thunder: Healer of Meta Tantay – UFO TV – DVD Release Date: February 22, 2005

Notes

External links
"The Plowboy Interview: Rolling Thunder", Mother Earth News, July/August 1981

1916 births
1997 deaths
Deaths from diabetes
Hippies
New Age spiritual leaders
People from Nevada
American people who self-identify as being of Native American descent